Curling clubs in Alberta are organized by the provincial governing body, Curling Alberta. Curling Alberta was formed in 2018 as an amalgamate of the Alberta Curling Federation (ACF), the Northern Alberta Curling Association (NACA), the Southern Alberta Curling Association (SACA), and the Peace Curling Association (PCA).

Northern Alberta Curling Association

Zone 1-6
Avonair Curling Club - Edmonton
Crestwood Curling Club - Edmonton
Derrick Curling Club - Edmonton
Edmonton Garrison Memorial Golf & Curling Club - Lancaster Park
Granite Curling Club - Edmonton
Jasper Place Curling Club - Edmonton
Ottewell Curling Club - Edmonton
Saville Community Sports Centre - Edmonton
Shamrock Curling Club - Edmonton
Sherwood Park Curling Club - Sherwood Park
St. Albert Curling Club - St. Albert
Thistle Curling Club - Edmonton

Zone 7
Bonnyville Curling Club - Bonnyville
Cold Lake Curling Club - Cold Lake
Elk Point Curling Club - Elk Point
Glendon Curling Club - Glendon
Lac La Biche Curling Club - Lac La Biche
Myrnam Curling Club - Myrnam
St. Paul Curling Club - St. Paul
Vilna Curling Club - Vilna

Zone 8
Innisfree Curling Club - Innisfree
Kitscoty Curling Club - Kitscoty
Lloydminster Curling Club - Lloydminster
Vermilion Curling Club - Vermilion

Zone 9
Chauvin Curling Club - Chauvin
Hardisty Curling Club - Hardisty
Irma Curling Club - Irma
Provost Curling Club - Provost
Wainwright Curling Club - Wainwright
Czar Curling Club - Czar

Zone 10
Bashaw Curling Club - Bashaw
Castor Curling Club - Castor
Consort Curling Club - Consort
Forestburg Curling Club - Forestburg
Stettler Curling Club - Stettler

Zone 11
Daysland Curling Club - Daysland
Hay Lakes Curling Club - Hay Lakes
Rose City Curling Club - Camrose
Ryley Curling Club - Ryley
Sedgewick Curling Club - Sedgewick
Strathcona Curling Club - Sherwood Park
Strome Curling Club - Strome
Tofield Curling Club - Tofield
Viking Curling Club - Viking

Zone 12
Ardrossan Curling Club - Ardrossan
Fort Saskatchewan Curling Club - Fort Saskatchewan
Gibbons Curling Club - Gibbons
Heather Curling Club - Vegreville
Lamont Curling Club - Lamont
Mundare Curling Club - Mundare
Redwater Curling Club - Redwater
Smoky Lake Curling Club - Smoky Lake
Two Hills Curling Club - Two Hills
Waskatenau Curling Club - Waskatenau

Zone 13
Athabasca Curling Club - Athabasca
Barrhead Curling Club - Barrhead
Boyle Curling Club - Boyle
Fort McMurray Oilsands Curling Club - Fort McMurray
Legal Curling Club - Legal
Morinville Curling Club - Morinville
Plamondon Curling Club - Plamondon
Swan Hills Curling Club - Swan Hills
Westlock Curling Club - Westlock

Zone 14
Bentley Curling Club - Bentley
Calumet Curling Club - Bashaw
Eckville Curling Club - Eckville
Lacombe Curling Club - Lacombe
Ponoka Curling Club - Ponoka
Rimbey Curling Club - Rimbey
Rocky Curling Club - Rocky Mountain House
Sylvan Lake Curling Club - Sylvan Lake

Zone 15
Alder Flats Community Agricultural Society - Alder Flats
Beaumont Curling Club - Beaumont
Calmar Curling Club - Calmar
Ellerslie Curling Club - Edmonton
Lakedell Curling Club - Westerose
Leduc Curling Club - Leduc
Millet Curling Club - Millet
Warburg Curling Club - Warburg
Wetaskiwin Curling Club - Wetaskiwin

Zone 16
Drayton Valley Curling Club - Drayton Valley
Edson & District Curling Club - Edson
Grande Cache Curling Club - Grande Cache
Hinton Curling Club - Hinton
Jasper Curling Club - Jasper
Lakeside Curling Club - Seba Beach
Mayerthorpe Curling Club - Mayerthorpe
Onoway Curling Club - Onoway
Peers Curling Club - Peers
Robb Curling Centre - Robb
Spruce Grove Curling Club - Spruce Grove
Westridge Curling Club - Stony Plain
Whitecourt Curling Club - Whitecourt
Wildwood Curling Club - Wildwood

Peace Curling Association
Beaverlodge Curling Club - Beaverlodge
Debolt & District Agriculture Society - Debolt
Fairview Curling Club - Fairview
Falher Curling Club - Falher
Fort Vermilion & District Curling Club - Fort Vermilion
Fox Creek Curling Club - Fox Creek
Grande Prairie Curling Centre - Grande Prairie
Grimshaw Curling Club - Grimshaw
High Prairie Curling Club - High Prairie
Hythe Curling Club - Hythe
La Glace Curling Club - La Glace
Manning Curling Club - Manning
Peace River Curling Club - Peace River
Rainbow Lake Curling Club - Rainbow Lake
Red Willow Curling Club - Valleyview
Sexsmith Curling Club - Sexsmith
Slave Lake Curling Club - Slave Lake
Spirit River Curling Club - Spirit River

Southern Alberta Curling Association

Acadia Recreation Complex - Calgary
Acme Curling Club - Acme
Airdrie Curling Club - Airdrie
Banff Curling Club - Banff
Bassano Curling Club - Bassano
Bow Island Curling Club - Bow Island
Bow Valley Community Club - Indus 
Brooks Curling Club - Brooks
Calgary Curling Club - Calgary
Calgary Winter Club - Calgary
Canmore Curling Club - Canmore
Carbon & District Agricultural Society - Carbon
Caroline Curling Club - Caroline
Carseland Curling Club - Carseland
Carstairs Curling Club - Carstairs
Chestermere Curling Club - Chestermere
Claresholm Curling Club - Claresholm
Coaldale Granite Club - Coaldale
Cochrane Curling Club - Cochrane
Coronation Curling Club - Coronation
Cremona Curling Club - Cremona
Crossfield Curling Club - Crossfield
Crowsnest Curling Club - Crowsnest Pass
Delburne Curling Club - Delburne
Delia Curling Club - Delia
Didsbury Curling Club - Didsbury
Drumheller Curling Club - Drumheller
Duchess Curling Club - Duchess
Fort Macleod Curling Club - Fort Macleod 
Garrison Curling Club - Calgary 
Hanna Curling Club - Hanna
Highwood Curling Club - High River
Huntington Hills Curling Club - Calgary
Hussar Curling Club - Hussar
Huxley Community Association - Huxley
Inglewood Golf & Curling Club - Calgary
Innisfail Curling Club - Innisfail
Irricana Curling Club - Irricana
Irvine & District Curling Club - Irvine
Lethbridge Curling Club - Lethbridge
Lomond Curling Club - Lomond
Madden Curling Club - Madden
Magrath Curling Club - Magrath
Medicine Hat Curling Club - Medicine Hat
Michener Hill Curling Club - Red Deer
Milo Curling Club - Milo
Nanton Curling Club - Nanton
North Hill Curling Club - Calgary 
Oilfields Curling Club - Black Diamond
Okotoks Curling Club - Okotoks
Olds Curling Club - Olds
Oyen Curling Club - Oyen
Pincher Creek Curling Club - Pincher Creek
Pidherney Curling Centre - Red Deer
Rockyford Curling Club - Rockyford
Rumsey & District Agricultural Society - Rumsey
Springbank Curling Club - Springbank
Standard Curling Club - Standard
Strathmore & District Curling Club - Strathmore
Sundre Curling Club - Sundre
Taber Curling Club - Taber
The Glencoe Club - Calgary 
Three Hills Curling Club - Three Hills
Torrington Curling Club - Torrington
Vauxhall & District Curling Association - Vauxhall
Vulcan Curling Club - Vulcan
Warner Curling Club - Warner
Youngstown Curling Club - Youngstown

Alberta Curling Federation

References

External links
Northern Alberta curling club listing
Peace Curling Association club listing
Southern Alberta curling club listing

 Alberta
 
Curling clubs
Curling in Alberta
Alberta